Verani is an Italian surname and the plural form of Verano. Notable people with the surname include:
Dario Verani (born 1995), Italian competitive open water swimmer
Pablo Verani (1938–2013), Argentine politician

See also
Anthony Veranis (1938–1966), American boxer

Italian-language surnames